Ma Boyong (born 14 Dec, 1980) is a Chinese novelist, columnist and blogger. In the year of 2010, he won People's Literature Prize, one of China's most prestigious honors.

His short story The City of Silence was translated into English by science fiction writer Ken Liu.

Books series published

References

1980 births
Living people
Chinese science fiction writers
Schneider Electric people
Writers from Inner Mongolia
People from Chifeng